Hololeptini is a tribe of clown beetles in the family Histeridae. There are about 6 genera and more than 130 described species in Hololeptini.

Genera
These six genera belong to the tribe Hololeptini:
 Dimalus Marseul, 1870
 Eutidium Lewis, 1903
 Hololepta Paykull, 1811 (clown beetles)
 Iliotona Carnochan, 1917
 Oxysternus Erichson, 1834
 Petalosoma Lewis, 1903

References

Further reading

External links

 

Histeridae
Articles created by Qbugbot